Sascha Hildmann (born 7 April 1972) is a German football manager of Preußen Münster.

Managerial career
In October 2018, Hildmann was released by Sonnenhof Großaspach.

On 6 December 2018, he was announced as the new manager of 1. FC Kaiserslautern. He was sacked on 16 September 2019.

He was hired by Preußen Münster on 27 December 2019.

Managerial statistics

References

External links

1972 births
Living people
People from Kaiserslautern
German footballers
Footballers from Rhineland-Palatinate
Association football defenders
1. FC Kaiserslautern II players
1. FC Kaiserslautern players
1. FC Saarbrücken players
Alemannia Aachen players
FC 08 Homburg players
2. Bundesliga players
German football managers
3. Liga managers
SV Elversberg managers
SG Sonnenhof Großaspach managers
1. FC Kaiserslautern managers
SC Preußen Münster managers
FK Pirmasens players